The European Security Order Recast: Scenarios for the Post-Cold War Era was a 1990 international relations book by Barry Buzan, Morten Kelstrup, Pierre Lemaitre, Elzbieta Tromer and Ole Waever. The book focused on structural transformations in European security at the end of the Cold War and argues that concerns about traditional military security would decrease and that the issue of  societal security would become more important in the future. The work is considered to be belong to the Copenhagen School of security studies.

References

Copenhagen School (security studies)
1990 non-fiction books